Abdul Rahman Mohamed Taib (born 5 December 1942) is a politician from Brunei who served as Speaker of Legislative Council since February 2015. He also took on the role of representing the Brunei Government In matters pertaining to trade, commerce, and education in regional and international organizations.

Early life and education 
He was born in 5 December 1942. His education degrees include; Bachelor of Arts (Honours) Malaya in 1966, Advanced Course in Management and Diplomacy, University of Oxford, United Kingdom in 1978, Doctor of Law, honoris causa, University of Hull, United Kingdom in 1991, Doctor of Letters, honoris causa, University of Brunei Darussalam in 1996, and lastly a Honorary Fellowship of the University of Wales Institute, Cardiff in 2010.

Career 
From 1966 to 1980, he work in the Administrative Office in the Department of Government Secretary, Senior Administrative Officer for His Majesty's Advisor, Director of Personnel and Head of Diplomatic Service. Moreover, he was also a Member of the Council of Ministers, the Royal Council and the National Council. He became Minister of Development from 1 January 1984 to 21 October 1986 and State Secretary from 1980 to 1984. Abdul Rahman was the Minister of Education twice from 21 October 1986 to 30 November 1988 and from 24 May 2005 to 29 May 2010, making him the 2nd and 4th minister of that ministry respectively. Additionally, he was the Minister of Industry and Primary Resources from 30 November 1988 to 24 May 2005.

Honours 
On 3 December 1981, he was given the title of Yang Dimuliakan Pehin Orang Kaya Setia Pahlawan. It would then be upgraded to Yang Dimuliakan Pehin Orang Kaya Lela on 1 April 2004. He has earned the following awards;

  Order of Setia Negara Brunei First Class (PSNB) – Dato Seri Setia
  Order of Paduka Seri Laila Jasa Third Class (SLJ)
  Sultan Hassanal Bolkiah Medal (PHBS)
  Meritorious Service Medal (PJK)
  Long Service Medal (PKL)
  Proclamation of Independence Medal – (1 January 1984)
  Coronation Medal – (1 August 1968)
  Sultan Golden Jubilee Medal – (5 October 2017)
  Sultan Silver Jubilee Medal – (5 October 1992)
  National Day Silver Jubilee Medal – (23 February 2009)

References 

Living people
1942 births
Speakers of Legislative Council of Brunei
Government ministers of Brunei
Education ministers of Brunei